is a Japanese visual novel developed by Circus that was released in limited and regular editions on April 27, 2012 as a DVD for Windows and is rated for ages 15 and up. It is the third main installment of the Da Capo visual novel franchise, after Da Capo and Da Capo II. The story takes place 20 years after the events from Da Capo II. The gameplay in Da Capo III follows a branching plot line which offers pre-determined scenarios with courses of interaction, and focuses on the five female main characters. A 13-episode anime adaptation aired between January and March 2013.

Gameplay
Da Capo III is a romance visual novel in which the player assumes the role of Kiyotaka Yoshino. Much of its gameplay is spent on reading the story's narrative and dialogue. Da Capo III follows a branching plot line with multiple endings, and depending on the decisions that the player makes during the game, the plot will progress in a specific direction. There are five main plot lines that the player will have the chance to experience, one for each of the heroines in the story. After the completion of the first four heroine routes, an additional scenario called Zero is made available, which revolves around Aoi Hinomoto, another heroine of the game. After Zero is finished, another route is made available. Throughout gameplay, the player is given multiple options to choose from, and text progression pauses at these points until a choice is made. To view all plot lines in their entirety, the player will have to replay the game multiple times and choose different choices to further the plot to an alternate direction.

Plot

Da Capo III occurs about 20 years after Da Capo II on Hatsune island, once famous for its everlasting cherry trees. Ricca Morizono, president of Kazami Academy's official newspaper club, is determined to prove the existence of magic along with Kiyotaka Yoshino, the only male member of the club. There are four other girls in the club: Himeno Katsuragi, Kiyotaka's childhood friend; Charles Yoshino, Kiyotaka's cousin; Sara Rukawa, a transfer student; and Aoi Hinomoto, a frail but energetic part-timer. One day, Ricca suggests they should visit the rumored magical cherry tree to test its power by making a wish together. It suddenly blooms once again to their surprise, and all receive an unknown text message from the distant past telling them to fulfill a promise. In the following days investigating the source of the message, they begin to gain recollection of the events of their previous life. They are ultimately greeted by Sakura Yoshino, who tells them about their previous life in 1950.

All but Aoi were students in an underground magical school in London known as "The Weather Vane" or "Kazamidori". London was surrounded by a mysterious magical fog driving magicians out of control at that time, and Sakura Yoshino who was supposed to live in the 21st century was also teleported to 1950s London. Kiyotaka helped settle several incidents and was elected member of the student's council. The player is given a choice to develop a romance relationship with Ricca, Charles, Himeno or Sara. After clearing all four routes, the player advances into the Zero chapter.

In Zero, it is revealed that the magic fog is summoned by Aoi, who insists that she does not own magical power. Aoi foresees that she will die in a future summer. Terrified, she uses a spell to make the world loop between November 1950 and April 1951. The spell makes the fog to appear and brings Sakura to the past. Kiyotaka encourages Aoi to face the future, but they fail to dissipate the fog at the end of April 1951, causing them to loop once again.

Aoi tells everyone about the problem in chapter Da Capo, and the spell is dissipated with the help of everyone in Weather Vane, sending Sakura back to future. The magicians seal their memories into the cherry blossom tree, scheduled to be released when they reunion under the tree. They also make a promise to hanami when cherry reblossoms. After that they loop back one last time to live a life without fog and time loop. The promise brings everyone's reincarnation to Hatsune island to reunite with Sakura, and the game ends with everyone doing hanami with her.

Development and release
Da Capo III is the 52nd title developed by the visual novel developer Circus. The game's production was headed by Tororo, president of Circus. The scenario was written by two people: Kōta Takeuchi and Chihare Ameno, who is also the game's director. Character design and art direction for the game was split between two artists: Natsuki Tanihara and Yuki Takano. Music in the game is performed by four artists: CooRie, Yozuca, Aimi Terakawa and Suzuko Mimori.

Da Capo III was first announced on November 1, 2009 at Circus' 10th Anniversary Premium Concert and Announcement event as one of the ten Da Capo-related announcements made at the event, and was formally unveiled in the August 2011 issue of Dengeki G's Magazine. Da Capo III was released on April 27, 2012 in limited and regular editions, playable as a DVD for Windows and is rated for ages 15 and up. The limited edition came bundled with an original illustration booklet, the game's original soundtrack album, and a promotional card from the Weiß Schwarz collectible card game.

Da Capo III was ported to the PlayStation Portable by Kadokawa Games under the title Da Capo III Plus released on February 28, 2013. An updated version of the original game with additional story and visuals titled Da Capo III R was released on May 24, 2013 for Windows and is rated for ages 15 and up. An adult version of Da Capo III R titled Da Capo III R: X-rated was released on May 31, 2013. A sequel titled Da Capo III: Platinum Partner was released on April 25, 2014. Another sequel titled Da Capo III: With you was released on September 30, 2016, and another sequel titled Da Capo III: Dream Days was released on September 29, 2017.

MangaGamer released a demo of an English version of Da Capo III for Linux, macOS and Windows on December 23, 2016, and the full version was released on January 20, 2017 in both all-ages and adult versions. The all-ages version was also released on Steam.

Adaptations

Internet radio show
An Internet radio show to promote Da Capo III titled  had a pre-broadcast on January 5, 2012, and began regular broadcasting on February 2, 2012. The show is streamed online every Thursday, and is produced by the Japanese Internet radio station Hibiki. The show is hosted by the voice actresses of the five heroines in Da Capo III: Erika Kaihō as Aoi Hinomoto, Mikoi Sasaki as Himeno Katsuragi, Emi Nitta as Ricca Morizono, Ui Miyazaki as Charles Yoshino, and Chiyo Ōsaki as Sara Rukawa.

Manga
A manga adaptation illustrated by Yuka Kayura began serialization in the May 2012 issue of Kadokawa Shoten's Comptiq magazine. A second manga illustrated by Nonoka Hinata began serialization in the September 2012 issue of ASCII Media Works' Dengeki G's Magazine.

Anime
A 13-episode anime adaptation, produced by the anime production committee Kazami Gakuen Kōshiki Dōga-bu (a pseudonym for Actas) and directed by Kenichi Ishikura, aired between January 5 and March 30, 2013.

Music
The Da Capo III visual novel has nine pieces of theme music: four opening themes, two ending themes, and three insert songs. The four opening themes are:  by Yozuca,  by No Life Negotiator, "Shiny Steps!!" by Suzuko Mimori, and "True Magic..." by Yurica/Hana-tan. The two ending themes are:  by Hiromi Satō, and "All is Love for you" by CooRie.

Other ending themes include  by Yozuca for episodes 1 and 10, and "Reflection" by Emi Nitta for episode 6.

Reception
Da Capo III ranked at No. 6 in terms of national PC game pre-orders in Japan in March 2012. In 2012, Da Capo III went on to rank three times in terms of national sales of PC games in Japan. The rankings were at No. 3 and No. 8 in April for the regular and limited editions, respectively, and No. 11 in May.

Notes

References

External links
Official website 
Anime official website 

2012 manga
2012 video games
2013 anime television series debuts
Anime television series based on video games
ASCII Media Works manga
Bishōjo games
D.C.: Da Capo
Dengeki G's Magazine
Fantasy anime and manga
Fantasy video games
Harem anime and manga
Harem video games
Japan-exclusive video games
Linux games
MacOS games
Kadokawa Shoten manga
Mainichi Broadcasting System original programming
Manga based on video games
PlayStation Portable games
Romance video games
Romantic comedy anime and manga
Seinen manga
Tokyo MX original programming
Video games developed in Japan
Video games set in Japan
Video games set in London
Visual novels
Windows games
MangaGamer games
Video games set in the 1950s
Video games about time loops